Thomas Veres (born c. 1926 in Budapest) was the photographer for Raoul Wallenberg who documented the Holocaust in Budapest during World War II.

His photographs were used in the film The Last Days (1998), directed by James Moll.

External links
Personal memoir
Raoul Wallenberg Award biography
Thomas Veres: I Was There

Raoul Wallenberg